The 2010 European Rally Championship season was the 58th season of the FIA European Rally Championship. The season had 11 rallies, beginning with Rally 1000 Miglia on 22 April. The championship was contested by 24 drivers from 6 countries. Luca Rossetti won 4 events and claimed his second European rally championship title.

Calendar and winners

As in the previous year, the calendar consisted of 11 rounds. Rally Bulgaria was a World Rally Championship event in 2010, but Rally Poland was back in the ERC calendar. The other 10 rounds remained the same, although in a slightly different order.

Championship standings
For the final classification in a rally, the winner got 25 points, the runner-up 18 and the third placed driver 15. Drivers ranked 4 to 10 got 12–10–8–6–4–2–1 point(s). Additionally, the top five of every leg were awarded 7–5–3–2–1 point(s). Only drivers who participated in least 5 events qualified for the championship ranking.

External links
 Official website

References

European Rally Championship
2010
2010 in European sport